Seduction generally is the process of enticing a reluctant person to lead astray, as from duty, rectitude, or the like; to corrupt, to persuade or induce to engage in sexual behavior.

Seduction may also refer to:

Film
 Seduction (1973 film), a 1973 Italian film
 Seduction (1981 film), a 1981 Mexican film
 Seduction (2013 film), a 2013 Filipino film
 Seduction: The Cruel Woman, a 1985 German film

Music 
 Seduction (band), an American dance music group
 Seduction (The Danse Society album), 1982
 Seduction (Boney James album), 1995
 Seduction (Frank Sinatra album), 2009
 Seduction (Flex album), 2015
 "Seduction", a song by Wiley from Chill Out Zone
 "Seduction, a song by Eminem from Recovery
 "Seduction, a song by Usher from Confessions

Theatre
 Seduction (Holcroft play), a 1787 play by Thomas Holcroft
 Seduction (Heifner play), a play by Jack Heifner

Other uses
 San Diego Seduction, a Legends Football League team
 Seduction (tort), a civil wrong in common law legal systems

See also
 Streethawk: A Seduction, a 2001 album by Destroyer
 "Seducción", a 2005 single by Thália
 The Seduction (disambiguation)